Los Primera (The Primera Brothers) is the debut studio album by Venezuelan sibling duo Servando & Florentino. The album was nominated "Tropical/Salsa Album of the Year by a Duo or Group" and "Tropical/Salsa Album of the Year by a New Artist" at the 1999 Billboard Latin Music Awards. The contains the lead single "Una Fan Enamorada".

Track listing

References

1998 debut albums
Servando & Florentino albums
Spanish-language albums
Warner Music Latina albums